Ibero College Tijuana, opened in 1982, is a Jesuit middle and high school on the campus of Ibero-American University Tijuana in Playas de Tijuana, Tijuana, Mexico.

History
In 1982, the high school was opened on the premises of Cuauhtlatóhuac Institute. Undergraduate degrees were offered also, in architecture, law, and graphic design. Manuel Ruiz Ugalde was the first director. Two years later the school moved to Playas de Tijuana. In 1998, the school year opened at its present facility. In 2010, Ibero College Tijuana began offering the baccalaureate as well as secondary education.

See also
 List of Jesuit sites

References  

High schools in Mexico
Private schools in Mexico
Educational institutions established in 1982
Jesuit schools in Mexico